Hansjörg Jäkle (born 19 October 1971) is a German former ski jumper who competed from 1993 to 2002. His career best achievement was winning a gold medal in the team large hill event at the 1994 Winter Olympics in Lillehammer. He also won a silver medal in the team large hill at the 1995 FIS Nordic World Ski Championships in Thunder Bay. His best individual finish at World Cup level was second in Bischofshofen on 6 January 1998.

External links
 
 

German male ski jumpers
1971 births
Living people
Olympic ski jumpers of Germany
Ski jumpers at the 1994 Winter Olympics
Ski jumpers at the 1998 Winter Olympics
Olympic medalists in ski jumping
FIS Nordic World Ski Championships medalists in ski jumping
Medalists at the 1998 Winter Olympics
Medalists at the 1994 Winter Olympics
Olympic gold medalists for Germany
Olympic silver medalists for Germany
People from Schwarzwald-Baar-Kreis
Sportspeople from Freiburg (region)
20th-century German people